Henry Miller Morris (17 December 1919 –  13 March 1993) was a Scottish footballer who played for East Fife, Dundee United and the Scotland national team as a centre forward.

Morris, a Dundonian, joined East Fife from Dundee Violet in 1946, having previously played with another junior Dundee side, Lochee Central, during the War. He scored 60 goals during the 1947–48 League campaign as East Fife won the Second Division title. That same season he also helped his side claim the League Cup, the first time it had been won by a side out with the top flight. He won a further League cup with East Fife in 1950 before moving to Dundee United in 1953, where he retired.

Morris scored a hat-trick in his only Scotland cap, an 8–2 win over Ireland in October 1949.

See also
 List of Scotland national football team hat-tricks

References

External links
 
 Profile at Londonhearts.com
 

1919 births
Footballers from Dundee
1993 deaths
Scottish footballers
Scotland international footballers
East Fife F.C. players
Dundee United F.C. players
Scottish Football League players
Association football forwards
Portadown F.C. players
Dundee Violet F.C. players